The Yekaterinoslav electoral district was a constituency created for the 1917 Russian Constituent Assembly election.

The electoral district covered the Yekaterinoslav Governorate. Yekaterinoslav was a large province; ethnically and economically diverse. The Yekaterinoslav electoral district recorded the highest vote for a landowners list in the country. List 1, Landowners and Nonpartisan Progressives, gathered 26,597 votes (2.2%), and was headed by Mikhail Rodzianko (an Octobrist leader, having served as the presiding officer in the 3rd and 4th Dumas, elected on the Stolypin franchise). Joseph Stalin stood as a candidate on the Bolshevik list. The conservative press reported a quiet and orderly election in the province.

Out of the ten deputies elected from List 5, nine belonged to the Ukrainian Socialist-Revolutionary Party and one belonged to the Ukrainian Social Democratic Labour Party.

Results

In Yekaterinoslav town the Bolshevik list won the election, obtaining 20,849 votes (26.4%), followed by the Jewish National Electoral Committee 14,521 votes (18.3%), the Ukrainian socialist bloc 12,950 votes (16.4%), Kadets 9,224 votes (11.7%), SRs 6,627 votes (8.4%), Mensheviks 4,601 votes (5.8%), Landowners 3,608 votes (4.5%), the United Jewish Socialist Labour Party 1,781 votes (2.3%), Bund 1,545 votes (1.9%), Cooperative-Popular Socialists 1,007 votes (1.3%), Poalei-Zion 624 votes (0.8%), Unity 607 votes (0.8%), Germans 533 votes (0.7%), Orthodox-Farmers list 531 votes (0.7%) and Greeks 43 votes. The Ukrainian list dominated the vote in the Yekaterinoslav garrison, obtaining 3,770 votes (41.9%), followed by the Bolsheviks with 1,756 votes (19.5%), SRs 1,415 votes (15.7%), Jewish National Electoral Committee 720 votes (8%), Landowners 461 votes (5.1%), Kadets 301 votes (3.3%), Mensheviks 286 votes (3.2%), Popular Socialists-Cooperative 100 votes (1.1%), Unity 59 votes (0.7%), United Jewish Socialist Labour Party 56 votes (0.7%), Germans 49 votes (0.5%) and Orthodox-Farmer list 33 votes (0.4%).

Ballots

References

Electoral districts of the Russian Constituent Assembly election, 1917
1910s elections in Ukraine